Santa Rosa–Tarlac Road, signed as National Route 58 (N58) of the Philippine highway network, is a  major primary road in the provinces of Nueva Ecija and Tarlac. It traverses and connects through the municipalities of Santa Rosa, Zaragoza, La Paz and the city of Tarlac.

History 
The road is designated as N58 during the assignment of routes.

Route description 
The road serves as a major highway when going to La Paz or Zaragoza and Tarlac from Santa Rosa and vice versa.

Santa Rosa to Zaragoza 
The road starts at the junction with Daang Maharlika (N1/AH26) and Santa Rosa–Fort Magsaysay Road in Santa Rosa, Nueva Ecija. The road continues west and passes to the municipality of Zaragoza, Nueva Ecija.

La Paz to Tarlac City 
The road is named as Tarlac–Santa Rosa Road and it reaches La Paz and the province of Tarlac. It reaches the city of Tarlac and makes a junction on Subic-Clark-Tarlac Expressway Tarlac–Pangasinan–La Union Expressway, and Central Luzon Link Expressway (CLLEX). The road meets its western terminus at its intersection with MacArthur Highway (N2) and the unnumbered Juan Luna Street in Tarlac City.

Intersections

References 

Roads in Tarlac
Roads in Nueva Ecija